Benjamín Noval González (born 23 January 1979) is a former Spanish professional road bicycle racer, who competed as a professional between 2001 and 2013.

Major results

2000
 9th Overall Vuelta a Navarra
2002
 6th Overall Vuelta a La Rioja
 9th Overall Volta a Catalunya
1st  Points classification
2003
 3rd Road race, National Road Championships
 6th Overall Volta a Catalunya
2004
 1st Stage 4 (TTT) Tour de France
 3rd Clásica de Almería
2005
 1st Stage 4 (TTT) Tour de France

Notes

External links

1979 births
Living people
People from Mieres, Asturias
Spanish male cyclists
Cyclists from Asturias